Starhawk is an American writer and activist.

Starhawk may also refer to:
 Starhawk (2012 video game), a video game for the PlayStation 3
 Starhawk (1979 video game), a vector arcade game by Cinematronics
 Star Hawks, a comic strip
 Starhawk (comics), an antihero in the Earth-691 timeline of the Marvel Comics universe
 Aleta Ogord or Starhawk, a superheroine in a future of the Marvel Comics universe